Pseudochromis eichleri the Eichler’s dottyback, is a species of ray-finned fish from the Pacific Ocean around Indonesia, which is a member of the family Pseudochromidae.

Etymology
The fish is named for Dieter Eichler, who was the first to photograph the species.

References

eichleri
Taxa named by Anthony C. Gill
Taxa named by Gerald R. Allen
Taxa named by Mark van Nydeck Erdmann
Fish described in 2012